Route 25 is a highway in south-eastern Missouri.  Its northern terminus is at Business Interstate 55/U.S. Route 61/Route 34 in Jackson.  Its southern terminus is at U.S. Route 412/Route 84 in Kennett.

Route 25 was one of the original 1922 state highways.  Its original northern terminus was at Route 9 in Festus.  In 1926, with the creation of the U.S. Highway system, Route 9 from St. Louis to Hematite became part of U.S. Route 61, which was then routed down Route 25 to Jackson, moving Route 25's northern terminus to Jackson, too.

Until February 1981, when U.S. Route 412 was designated across the southernmost section, "the Bootheel", thus supplanting Route 25 south and west of Kennett, Route 25 passed Senath and Arbyrd, taking a sharp westward turn and heading across the St. Francis River and the Arkansas border, feeding westward to join the former Arkansas Highway 25 (now U.S. 412) toward Paragould, Arkansas. The old section of Route 25 south and west of Kennett now bears Missouri supplemental route designations.

Major intersections

Business loop

A three mile business route of MO 25 exists in Malden.

References

025
Transportation in Dunklin County, Missouri
Transportation in New Madrid County, Missouri
Transportation in Stoddard County, Missouri
Transportation in Cape Girardeau County, Missouri